White Pelican Provincial Park is a provincial park in British Columbia, Canada and is located 31 km northeast of Alexis Creek.

Habitat
The park hosts the only nesting colony of the American white pelican in British Columbia, an endangered species. As such, boating, hiking and recreational activities are restricted within the park for much of the year. It is managed for the protection of the American white pelican, which is an endangered species in British Columbia.

External links
 BC Parks - White Pelican Provincial Park

Provincial parks of British Columbia
Geography of the Chilcotin